The Way Out: The Gay Man's Guide to Freedom, No Matter if You're in Denial, Closeted, Half In, Half Out, Just Out, or Been Around the Block is a self-help book for gay men. It was written by Christopher Lee Nutter, a journalist living in New York City. The book is a memoir of the life of a gay man who grew up in the American South and later moved to New York City. It presents a guide to finding happiness and freedom while living as a gay man. The Way Out was published by HCI press  in May 2006.

References

External links
 Publisher's Website
 Nutter's Website
 Time Out New York article
 Out in America interview
 Publishers Weekly article
 AOL Coaches interview

2006 non-fiction books
Gay non-fiction books
LGBT autobiographies
Self-help books
LGBT literature in the United States